Eliot Tabron (born May 23, 1960) is an American former sprinter.

References

1960 births
Living people
American male sprinters
Universiade medalists in athletics (track and field)
Place of birth missing (living people)
Universiade gold medalists for the United States
Medalists at the 1983 Summer Universiade